Sculcoates power station supplied electricity to Kingston upon Hull and the wider East Yorkshire area from 1898. An earlier 1893 station in Dagger Lane had operated public lighting in Hull Old Town. Sculcoates power station was built and operated by Kingston upon Hull Corporation on a site in Sculcoates Lane adjacent to the Beverley and Barmston Drain. The power station was increased in size as demand for electricity grew, it was redeveloped several times: including major rebuilds in 1927–29 and in 1938–1952. The power station was closed in 1976 and was subsequently demolished.

History
In 1880 Kingston upon Hull Corporation sought a Local Act of Parliament to allow it, or third parties, to generate and supply electricity for public lighting in the Old Town. This authority was obtained in the Hull (Corporation) Electric Lighting Act 1880 (43 & 44 Vict. c. cxxv). This was only the second such legal authorisation in the United Kingdom following the Liverpool (Corporation) Electric Lighting Act 1879. A street lighting scheme was built in Hull, however, the lights proved to be unreliable and were discontinued in 1884.

In 1890 Kingston upon Hull Corporation applied for a Provisional Order under the Electric Lighting Acts to generate and supply electricity to the town. This was granted by the Board of Trade and was confirmed by Parliament through the Electric Lighting Orders (No.6) Act 1890 (54 & 55 Vict. c. cxci). The Hull Corporation electricity undertaking constructed a power station in 1893 in Dagger Lane. The electricity undertaking initially had 33 consumers, this increased to 271 in 1894 and to 679 in 1898.

To meet increasing demand for electricity a new power station was built in Sculcoates Lane (53°45'48.9"N 0°20'41.7"W) which allowed power to be supplied to west of the Old Town and to the east side of the River Hull. The station was located where the King George Docks railway line crosses the Beverley and Barmston Drain. The railway enabled the delivery of coal to the station and the drainage channel provided cooling water.

Equipment specification
The first Sculcoates plant comprised Willans engines coupled directly to Siemens and Holmes dynamos. There were also Crompton-Howell and Epstein accumulators to maintain current when demand exceeded the generating capacity. In 1898 the generating capacity was 880 kW. There were calculated to be 43,534 lamps of 8 candle power.

The power station was extended several times over the first half of the twentieth century.

Post-war plant
Following the First World War new plant was installed to meet growing demand for electricity. By 1923 the plant comprised:

 Coal-fired boilers generating a maximum of 434,000 lb/h (54.7 kg/s) of steam, these supplied steam to:

 Generators
 2 × 45  kW reciprocating engines
 1 × 180 kW reciprocating engine
 2 × 200 kW reciprocating engines
 4 × 460 kW reciprocating engines
 7 × 500 kW reciprocating engines
 2 × 2,000 kW steam turbines (AC)
 1 × 5,000 kW steam turbine (AC)

These gave a total generating capacity of 6,010 kW of Direct Current, and 9,000 kW of Alternating Current.

Electricity supplies were available to consumers as 220 and 440 Volts DC; and 3-phase, 50 Hz AC at 230 and 450 Volts.

New plant 1925–46
New low pressure (LP) generating sets were commissioned in 1925–26 and high pressure (HP) sets in 1927–46.

 Boilers
 3 × Clarke-Chapman 187,500 lb/h (23.62 kg/s), steam conditions 400 psi and 825°F (27.6 bar, 441 °C), feed water 250 °F (121 °C),
 5 × Clarke-Chapman 110,000 lb/h (13.86 kg/s), steam conditions 400 psi and 775 °F (27.6 bar, 413 °C), feed water 210 °F (99 °C),
 2 × Clarke-Chapman 200,000 lb/h (25.2 kg/s), steam conditions 400 psi and 825°F (27.6 bar, 441 °C), feed water 300 °F (149 °C),

The boilers had a total evaporative capacity of 1,492,500 lb/h (188 kg/s), the boilers supplied steam to:

 Turbo-alternators:
 1 × 7 MW Brush-Ljungstrom, 6.6 kV
 1 × 5 MW Brush-Ljungstrom, 6.6 kV
 2 × 12.5 MW Brush-Ljungstrom, 6.6 kV
 1 × 25 MW Parsons, 6.6 kV
 1 × 30 MW Parsons, 22 kV
 1 × 25 MW GEC, 6.6 kV

The total installed generating capacity was 122 MW.

Cooling water was abstracted from the adjacent Beverley and Barmston Drain. There was one 2.5 million gallons per hour (3.16 m3/s) Mouchel concrete cooling tower. There were also 9 Davenport timber towers with a capacity of 3.24 million gallons per hour (4.09 m3/s). The total cooling water flowrate was 5.7 million gallons per hour (7.2 m3/s). The concrete cooling tower was located north of the railway line; a map of 1928 show five rows of ‘tanks’ and marked ‘cooling towers’, and ‘sluices’ on the drainage channel. A 1950 aerial photograph shows the Davenport towers were south of the railway.

Coal was delivered to the site via dedicated sidings connected to the adjacent King George Dock line.

Operations
In 1898 maximum electricity demand was 687 kW, there were 679 customers, and the undertaking sold 467.352 MWh of electricity.

The extension of the undertaking in 1911 entailed the expenditure of £99,322. This was broken down as follows:

 Buildings £19,808
 Machinery £37,297
 Extensions to mains £20,188
 High-tension mains £14,243
 Motors for rental £4,996

This scheme was financed by a 17-year loan.

The operating data for 1921–23 is shown in the table:

It was noted in the inter-war period that all the streets in many prosperous Southern towns and in some Northern towns such as Birkenhead, Derby and Hull had been wired for electricity.

To meet increasing demands for electricity the supply area served by Sculcoates power station was expanded. The area of supply encompassed Sutton (1914), Hessle (1915), Sculcoates Rural District (1922), and Beverley, Hedon, and Cottingham, and parts of Patrington, Sculcoates, and Skirlaugh Rural Districts in 1929. In 1932 there were nearly 49,000 consumers, rising to 95,000 in 1946. The supply area was over 160 square miles (414 km2).

Under the terms of the Electricity (Supply) Act 1926 (16–17 Geo. 5 c. 51) the Central Electricity Board (CEB) was established in 1926. The CEB identified high efficiency ‘selected’ power station that would supply electricity most effectively; Sculcoates was designated a selected station. The CEB also constructed the national grid (1927–33) to connect power stations within a region. Bulk supplies were sold to the South East Yorkshire Light and Power Company, which supplied a large part of the East Riding. The Central Electricity Board took bulk supplies from the Sculcoates station: in 1939 almost one quarter of the units generated was sold to the Board.

Operating data for 1946
Sculcoates power station operating data in 1946 was as follows:

Upon nationalisation of the British electricity supply industry in 1948 under the provisions of the Electricity Act 1947 (10–11 Geo. 6 c. 54)  the Sculcoates electricity undertaking was abolished. Ownership of Sculcoates power station was vested in the British Electricity Authority, and subsequently the Central Electricity Authority and the Central Electricity Generating Board (CEGB). At the same time the electricity distribution and sales responsibilities of the Sculcoates electricity undertaking were transferred to the Yorkshire Electricity Board (YEB).

Operating data for 1954–71
Operating data for the period 1954–71 is shown in the table:

Closure
Sculcoates power station was decommissioned and disconnected from the national grid on 25 October 1976. The buildings and chimneys were subsequently demolished. The area has been redeveloped as housing.

See also
 Timeline of the UK electricity supply industry
 List of power stations in England

References

Coal-fired power stations in England
Demolished power stations in the United Kingdom
Former power stations in England
Buildings and structures in Kingston upon Hull